Noche y día (English: Night and Day) is a 2014-2015 Argentine telenovela produced by Pol-ka and broadcast by El Trece. It premiered on November 17, 2014 and ended on August 19, 2015 and also stars Facundo Arana and Romina Gaetani with the participations of Oscar Martínez, Eleonora Wexler, Eugenia Tobal and Gabriel Corrado.

Cast 
 Facundo Arana as Victorio "Vico" Villa
 Romina Gaetani as Paula Pico/ Paula Inchausti 
 Eleonora Wexler as Martina Mendoza
 Oscar Martínez as Guillermo Inchausti
 Gastón Soffritti as Benjamín "Benja" Liberman
 Coraje Ábalos as Gastón Santucho 
 Brenda Gandini as Lucila Villa
 Candela Vetrano as Milagros "Mili" Villa
 Pablo Rago as Fabián Aguilera 
 Gabriel Goity as Francisco "Paco" Longo
 Favio Posca as Roberto "Robert" Belardi 
 Eugenia Tobal as Bárbara Díaz  
 Gabriel Corrado as Federico Castro
 Marina Bellati as Evangelina "Eva" Cisneros
 Victorio D´Alessandro as Joaquín "Joaco" Agüero
 Martín Slipak as Sebastián Inchausti 
 Pablo Brichta as Humberto Peralta 
 Manuela Pal as Gisella Villa
 Maximiliano Ghione as Amadeo Lucero
 Florencia Raggi as Sofía Santa María 
 Graciela Stéfani as Patricia Pico 
 Claudio Rissi as Ismael Bisoni 
 Alejo Ortiz as Adrián Guedes
 Valeria Lois as Amanda Cejas
 Lautaro Perotti as Esteban Garrido
 Joaquín Rapalini Olivella as Valentino Garrido Mendoza
 María Pía Galiano as Jana Vergara 
 Diego Hodara as Estanislao "Pipi" Belardi
 Rodrigo Noya as Nicolás
 Johanna Francella as Jazmín
 Duilio Orso as Palacios
 Miguel Habud as Jalil
 Coral Gabaglio as Betty
 Maia Dosoretz as Catalina

References

External links 
  
 

2014 telenovelas
Argentine telenovelas
Pol-ka telenovelas
2014 Argentine television series debuts
2015 Argentine television series endings
Spanish-language telenovelas